This is a round-up of the 1991 Sligo Senior Football Championship. The 1991 final brought down the curtain on a great rivalry, as Tubbercurry defeated St. Mary's in the final by a solitary point, in what was the seventh final meeting in twelve years between both clubs.  This was Tubbercurry's 19th title in all, and would be their last of the twentieth century. The defending champions Shamrock Gaels crashed out of the championship in the opening round after defeat to Easkey.

First round

Quarter finals

Semi-finals

Final

References

 Sligo Champion (July–September 1991)

Sligo Senior Football Championship
Sligo Senior Football Championship